Peter Howitt (1928 - 22 September 2021) was an English set decorator. He was nominated for four Academy Awards in the category Best Art Direction.

Partial filmography

As set decorator
Academy Award nominations in bold

 Anne of the Thousand Days (1969)
 Revenge (1971)
 Assault (1971)
 Mary, Queen of Scots (1971) (nominated with Terence Marsh and Robert Cartwright)
 Follow Me! (1972)
 The Great Gatsby (1974)
 Superman (1978)
 Moonraker (1979)
 Superman II (1980)
 Ragtime (1981) (with John Graysmark, Patrizia von Brandenstein, Tony Reading, George DeTitta Sr. and George DeTitta Jr.)
 Evil Under the Sun (1982)
 The Pirates of Penzance (1983)
 The Lords of Discipline (1983)
 Never Say Never Again (1983)
 Indiana Jones and the Temple of Doom (1984)
 King David (1985)
 The Fourth Protocol (1987)
 Who Framed Roger Rabbit (1988) (with Elliot Scott)
 Indiana Jones and the Last Crusade (1989)
 White Hunter Black Heart (1990)
 Shining Through (1992)
 Just like a Woman (1992)
 Son of the Pink Panther (1993)
 Braveheart (1995)
 Impossible (1996)
 Fierce Creatures (1997)
 Elizabeth (1998) (with John Myhre)
 The Mummy (1999)
 The Four Feathers (2002)

As art director
 The Mikado (1967)
 Clash of the Titans (1981)
 Labyrinth (1986)

References

External links

1928 births
2021 deaths
People from London
English set decorators